Anisocnemus is a genus of beetles in the family Carabidae, containing the following species:

 Anisocnemus amblygonus Shpeley & Ball, 1978
 Anisocnemus validu Chaudoir, 1843

References

Harpalinae